Temporal artery may refer to:

 Deep temporal arteries, two in number, anterior and posterior, ascend between the temporalis and the pericranium
 Middle temporal artery, arises immediately above the zygomatic arch
 Superficial temporal artery, a major artery of the head